Carmageddon is a 1997 vehicular combat video game.

Carmageddon may also refer to:

 Interstate 405 closures in California in 2011,  2012 and 2020 for construction
 Commutageddon, the severe traffic delays that occurred during the January 25–27, 2011 North American blizzard

See also
 Karmageddon (disambiguation)